The Statute Law Revision Act 1861 (24 & 25 Vict c 101) is an Act of the Parliament of the United Kingdom.

History
Whereas James Williams called this the first of the Statute Law Revision Acts, it was predated by the Repeal of Obsolete Statutes Act 1856. It was intended, in particular, to facilitate the preparation of a revised edition of the statutes.

This Act was repealed for the United Kingdom by Group 1 of Part IX of Schedule 1 to the Statute Law (Repeals) Act 1998.

The enactments which were repealed (whether for the whole or any part of the United Kingdom) by this Act were repealed so far as they extended to the Isle of Man on 25 July 1991.

This Act was retained for the Republic of Ireland by section 2(2)(a) of, and Part 4 of Schedule 1 to, the Statute Law Revision Act 2007.

See also
Halsbury's Statutes

References

Further reading
A Collection of the Public General Statutes passed in the Twenty-fourth and Twenty-fifth Years of the reign of Her Majesty Queen Victoria, 1861. Queen's Printer. East Harding Street, London. 1861. Page 582 et seq. Digitised copy from Google Books.

External links

List of amendments and repeals in the Republic of Ireland from the Irish Statute Book.
The Statute Law Revision Act 1861, as applicable to New Zealand, from the Parliamentary Counsel Office.

United Kingdom Acts of Parliament 1861